Rudolf Langer (born 29 March 1939) is a retired German athlete. He competed at the 1964 Summer Olympics in the men's shot put and finished in 11th place. His wife Johanna Lüttge competed in the women's shot put at the same Olympics. His personal best is 19.83 m (1969).

References

1939 births
Living people
People from Szprotawa
People from the Province of Silesia
Sportspeople from Lubusz Voivodeship
German male shot putters
Athletes (track and field) at the 1964 Summer Olympics
Olympic athletes of the United Team of Germany